"In My Room" is a song by Frank Ocean, released as a single on November 2, 2019. Ocean wrote and produced the song alongside Michael Uzowuru. It was premiered on Ocean's Beats 1 radio show, Blonded Radio, two weeks after "DHL". The 7-inch single vinyl is set to include a remix by Benny Revival as its B-side.

Composition
The song features Ocean rapping and crooning over a looped synth line and a "simple" beat, with some drum programming done by Sango.

Critical reception
Matthew Schnipper of Pitchfork compared the song to the music of rapper Lil B and called the first two-thirds of the song "nice, if close to throwaway."

Charts

Certifications

References

2019 singles
2019 songs
Frank Ocean songs
Songs written by Frank Ocean
Songs written by Michael Uzowuru